Miguel Angel "Mikey" Lopez Jr. (born February 20, 1993) is an American professional soccer player who plays as a left-back for USL Championship club Birmingham Legion.

Career

College and amateur
Born in Dallas, Texas, Lopez attended the St. Stephens Academy in Austin, Texas when he was in seventh grade in order to attract college scouts. Lopez then attended the University of North Carolina at Chapel Hill for which he played for the university's soccer team, the North Carolina Tar Heels. While playing with the Tar Heels Lopez led his team to the 2011 NCAA Division I Men's Soccer Championship in which the Tar Heels won against the Charlotte 49ers and he was named the ACC Freshman Player of the Year. Overall in two seasons with the Tar Heels, Lopez scored five goals and notched up five assists.

Lopez also made one appearance for USL Premier Development League club Orange County Blue Star in 2011.

Sporting Kansas City
On January 17, 2013 Lopez was selected as the 14th overall draft pick by Sporting Kansas City in the 2013 MLS SuperDraft. Lopez made his debut for Sporting KC in a 2-0 win over the Des Moines Menace in the 2013 Lamar Hunt U.S. Open Cup third round on May 29, 2013.

Orlando City (loan)
On March 17, 2014 it was announced that Lopez would join Sporting USL Pro affiliate Orlando City on loan for the entire season. He made his debut for Orlando City on April 5, 2014.

OKC Energy (loan)
In early June 2014, Sporting Kansas City transferred Lopez' loan contract to Oklahoma City Energy FC, where he earned immediate playing time.

New York City FC
On January 26, 2016, New York City FC announced the signing of Lopez. He made his debut on March 6, 2016, replacing Tony Taylor in the 69th minute of a 4-3 win over Chicago. Lopez was released by New York at the end of the 2017 season.

San Antonio
On January 26, 2018, Lopez signed with USL side San Antonio FC for the 2018 season.

Birmingham Legion
On November 13, 2018, it was announced that Lopez would join Birmingham Legion ahead of their debut USL Championship season.

International
Lopez was born in Dallas to Mexican parents. Lopez was first called into the United States U20 national team in February 2013 and was a member of the squad that finished second at the 2013 CONCACAF U-20 Championship.

Career statistics

References

External links
 

1993 births
Living people
American soccer players
Association football midfielders
American people of Mexican descent
Major League Soccer players
New York City FC players
North Carolina Tar Heels men's soccer players
OKC Energy FC players
Orange County Blue Star players
Orlando City SC (2010–2014) players
People from Mission, Texas
San Antonio FC players
Birmingham Legion FC players
Soccer players from Texas
Sporting Kansas City draft picks
Sporting Kansas City players
USL Championship players
United States men's under-20 international soccer players
USL League Two players